Aveann Douglas (born 10 August 1986) is a Trinidadian former footballer who played as a midfielder and a forward. She has been a member of the Trinidad and Tobago women's national team.

Early life
Douglas was born and raised in Arima, Trinidad.

High school and college career
Douglas has attended the St. George's College in her native Trinidad. After finishing her high school career, she moved to the United States, where she has attended the Monroe Community College, the University of South Carolina Upstate and the University of West Florida.

Club career
Douglas has played in her country for Real Dimension.

International career
Douglas represented Trinidad and Tobago at the 2004 CONCACAF Women's U-19 Championship. She capped at senior level during the 2006 CONCACAF Women's Gold Cup.

International goals
Scores and results list Trinidad and Tobago' goal tally first.

References

External links

1986 births
Living people
People from Arima
Trinidad and Tobago women's footballers
Women's association football midfielders
Women's association football forwards
Monroe Community College alumni
USC Upstate Spartans women's soccer players
West Florida Argonauts women's soccer players
Trinidad and Tobago women's international footballers
Trinidad and Tobago expatriate women's footballers
Trinidad and Tobago expatriate sportspeople in the United States
Expatriate women's soccer players in the United States